James S. Simmons (October 1847 - ?) was a state legislator in Mississippi. He served in the Mississippi House of Representatives from  1874 to 1875 and from 1883 to 1884. He represented Issaquena County and Washington County, Mississippi. He also served as a county tax assessor in Issaquena County.

See also
African-American officeholders during and following the Reconstruction era

References

1847 births
Year of death missing
Date of birth missing